Babcock Memorial Park, also called Babcock Wayside, is a highway rest area and public boat launch on the Mississippi River in Elk River, Minnesota at the intersection of U.S. 10 and Route 169. Its name honors Highway Commissioner Charles Merritt Babcock, who was from the area and is regarded as the originator of the modern Minnesota State Highway System. The state owns it but has turned maintenance over to the city.

The park was built by the National Youth Administration in 1938 and 1939 and preserves two fieldstone council rings, a stone picnic table, and a hand-operated pump from that era. A geological marker, modern toilets, and other amenities were added later.

References

1938 establishments in Minnesota
Monuments and memorials in Minnesota
Protected areas established in 1938
Rest areas in the United States
Works Progress Administration in Minnesota
National Youth Administration